Harrison Miller Ford (born December 22, 1982) is an American actor.  He starred in the CBS medical drama Code Black as third-year resident Dr. Angus Leighton.

Life and career
Ford was born Harrison Miller Ford in 1982 in Dyersburg, Tennessee.  He began his acting career in middle school and attended high school at Memphis University School in Memphis.  He received his bachelor's degree in fine arts in theater with an emphasis in acting from Southern Methodist University's Meadows School of the Arts, and a master's degree in fine arts in acting at New York University's Tisch School of the Arts. Currently, Ford resides in Los Angeles and New York City.

Filmography

References

External links
 

Living people
20th-century American male actors
21st-century American male actors
Male actors from Tennessee
Tisch School of the Arts alumni
1983 births
People from Dyersburg, Tennessee